The Principal is an  Australian four-part drama series which aired over two weeks on SBS starting 7 October 2015. It was written by Kristen Dunphy and Alice Addison, directed by Kriv Stenders and produced by Ian Collie.

Cast
 Alex Dimitriades as Matt Bashir
 Aden Young as Adam Bilic
 Mirrah Foulkes as Kellie Norton
 Salvatore Coco as Frank Calabrisi
 Andrea Demetriades as Hafa Habeb
 Rahel Romahn as Tarek Ahmad
 Tyler De Nawi as Karim Ahmad
 Miles Gibson as Chris Langworth
 Narek Arman as Sami Vivas
 Karim Zreika as Bilal Folouk
 Rebecca Massey as Rina
 Tim Abdallah as Farid
 Thuso Lekwape as Kenny

Awards
At the 2016 58th Annual TV Week Logie Awards, Alex Dimitriades won the Most Outstanding Actor award for The Principal.

DVD release
The series was released as a Region 4 single disc DVD on 4 November 2015 by SBS in Australia.

References

External links
 

Special Broadcasting Service original programming
Australian drama television series
2015 Australian television series debuts
Television shows set in Sydney